Isaac Robinson may refer to:
 Ikey Robinson (1904–1990), American banjoist and vocalist
 Isaac Robinson (politician) (1975–2020), American lawyer and politician, member of the Michigan House of Representatives